The United Arab Republic Cup was held only once in 1961 due to the fall of the United Arab Republic, the union of Egypt and Syria and it was played between clubs from the two countries.

Format
The competition included 4 teams the winners and the runners-up of the Egypt Cup and the Syrian Cup.
The Egypt Cup Winner takes on the Syrian Cup Runner-up in Cairo, while the Syrian Cup Winner takes on the Egypt Cup Runner-up in Damascus.

Rounds
Al Ahly Cairo faced Al-Majd (was known as Al-Ahly Damascus) at Cairo International Stadium. The match ended with a decisive 4-1 win for Al Ahly Cairo who became the only Champion in this competition.

Semifinals

Final

References

United Arab Republic